Jaunsāti Parish is an administrative unit of Tukums Municipality, in the Courland region of Latvia.

Towns, villages and settlements of Jaunsāti Parish

References 

Parishes of Latvia
Tukums Municipality
Courland